Ludwig von Friedeburg (21 May 1924, in Wilhelmshaven – 17 May 2010, in Frankfurt am Main) was a German politician and sociologist. He served as Minister for Education for the state of Hesse from 1969 until 1974. During that period he forced the installation of Comprehensive Schools in the state of Hesse, heavily opposed by the Christian Democratic Union. He was a member of the Social Democratic Party of Germany.

His father was Hans-Georg von Friedeburg, Commander-in-chief of the Kriegsmarine. During the last year of World War II, Ludwig von Friedeburg became the youngest U-boat-commander of Germany ever during war periods, aged only 20.

References

Obituary

Bibliography
 

1924 births
2010 deaths
German sociologists
German untitled nobility
Social Democratic Party of Germany politicians
U-boat commanders (Kriegsmarine)
People from Wilhelmshaven
Officers Crosses of the Order of Merit of the Federal Republic of Germany
People from the Province of Hanover
German male writers
German prisoners of war in World War II